Morgan Zeba (born 24 August 1974) is a Swedish former professional footballer who played as a midfielder.

Club career

Zeba played for Landskrona BoIS in Division 2 Södra Götaland 1996.

In 1997, Zeba played for the Richmond Kickers in the USISL. On 16 April 1998 he signed with the Minnesota Thunder and played for them through the 2001 season. In 1999, Zeba and his teammates won the USL A-League championship.  He became a free agent in September 2001 and signed with the Charleston Battery for the 2002 season.

International career
He also played for the Swedish youth national teams.

References

1974 births
Living people
Swedish footballers
Landskrona BoIS players
Richmond Kickers players
Minnesota Thunder players
Charleston Battery players
A-League (1995–2004) players
Association football midfielders
Swedish expatriate footballers
Swedish expatriate sportspeople in the United States
Expatriate soccer players in the United States
Sweden youth international footballers
Footballers from Malmö